In the United Kingdom, emergency diversion routes, or formally off-network tactical diversion routes are planned road traffic routes that bypass the main trunk road network.

Emergency diversion routes provide the public, where possible, with a planned, checked and agreed junction to junction diversion route that circumnavigates an incident which has resulted in the closure of the main carriageway. In some other locations suitable diversion routes are not possible; this then requires National Highways and its partners to implement alternative tactics such as strategic signs and signals. These are managed by the National Traffic Control Centre (NTCC).

Emergency diversion routes are marked with road signs in the form of simple geometric shapes – open and filled circles, squares, and diamonds. Normally, these additions to roadsigns will be ignored by drivers.

When an incident closes a motorway or trunk road, police and National Highways traffic officers can activate 'trigger signs' at junctions before a closure advising traffic as to which symbol to follow around the incident along an alternative road and bring road users back onto the motorway or main road at a later junction beyond the closure.

The signs used for these routes can be found in the publication Know your Traffic Signs.

Emergency diversion route symbols

Solid versions

Hollow versions

Related signs

References

See also 
 National Traffic Control Centre
 Road signs in the United Kingdom

Road transport